William Dornan (17 January 1893 – 28 May 1937) was a Scottish footballer who appeared 389 times in the Scottish Football League and Scottish Cup for Hibernian between 1914 and 1927, playing at left back. He featured in two Scottish Cup finals in 1923 (which Hibs lost to Celtic) and 1924 (defeated by Airdrieonians). He also played for Leith Athletic and Queen of the South.

Dornan was badly injured on 28 May 1937, after being thrown from the top of an oil tank after an explosion, and thereafter being badly burned, at Pumpherston Oil Works in West Lothian. He died later at the Edinburgh Royal Infirmary.

References

1893 births
1937 deaths
Scottish footballers
Hibernian F.C. players
Leith Athletic F.C. players
Queen of the South F.C. players
Scottish Football League players
Scottish Junior Football Association players
Association football fullbacks
Footballers from West Lothian
Footballers from North Lanarkshire
Industrial accident deaths